Hinz may refer to:

 Hinz, Iran, a village in Qazvin Province
 Hinz BLT-ARA, a German aircraft design
 Freddi Hinz, satirical character of Viktor Giacobbo

People
 Hinz (surname)

See also
 Heinz (disambiguation)